Erico Cuna (born 25 May 2000) is a Mozambican swimmer. In 2019, he represented Mozambique at the 2019 World Aquatics Championships held in Gwangju, South Korea where he competed in the heats in the men's 50 metre freestyle event.

In 2018, he represented Mozambique at the 2018 Commonwealth Games held in Gold Coast, Australia.

References

External links
 

Living people
2000 births
Place of birth missing (living people)
Mozambican male freestyle swimmers
Commonwealth Games competitors for Mozambique
Swimmers at the 2018 Commonwealth Games